Jason Overstreet is an American politician from Washington. Overstreet is a former Republican member of the Washington House of Representatives, representing the 42nd district from 2011 to 2015.

Awards 
 2014 Guardians of Small Business award. Presented by NFIB.

Personal life 
Overstreet's wife is Jessica Overstreet. They have five children. Overstreet and his family live in Lynden, Washington.

References

External links 
 Jason Overstreet at ballotpedia.org
 Jason Overstreet at ourcampaigns.com
 Jensen, Overstreet battle for open seat at bbjtoday.com

Year of birth missing (living people)
Living people
Republican Party members of the Washington House of Representatives
People from Lynden, Washington